Almudena Muñoz Martínez (born November 4, 1968) is a former judo competitor from Spain who won the gold medal in women's 52 kg division at the 1992 Summer Olympics of Barcelona, Spain. Muñoz also competed at the 1996 Summer Olympics in Atlanta, United States.

External links
 
 Spanish Olympic Committee
 Videos of Almudena Muñoz in action (judovision.org)

1968 births
Living people
Spanish female judoka
Olympic judoka of Spain
Judoka at the 1992 Summer Olympics
Judoka at the 1996 Summer Olympics
Olympic gold medalists for Spain
Sportspeople from Valencia
Olympic medalists in judo
Medalists at the 1992 Summer Olympics
Mediterranean Games bronze medalists for Spain
Mediterranean Games medalists in judo
Competitors at the 1997 Mediterranean Games
20th-century Spanish women
21st-century Spanish women